Plorec-sur-Arguenon is a commune in the Côtes-d'Armor department of Brittany in northwestern France.

The river Arguenon flows through the commune.

Population

See also
 Communes of the Côtes-d'Armor department

References

External links

 

Communes of Côtes-d'Armor